This is a comparison of notable object database management systems, showing what fundamental object database features are implemented natively.

See also 
Comparison of object–relational database management systems
Comparison of relational database management systems
Object–relational database

References

External links 
 ObjectFile at GitHub

Database management systems
Object-oriented database management systems
object database management systems